

France
 French Somaliland – René Tirant, Governor of French Somaliland (1962–1966)

Portugal
 Angola – Silvino Silvério Marquês, High Commissioner of Angola (1962–1966)

United Kingdom
 Malta Colony – Sir Maurice Henry Dorman, Governor of Malta (1962–1964)
 Northern Rhodesia
 Governor – Sir Evelyn Dennison Hone, Governor of Northern Rhodesia (1959–1964)
 Autonomy granted on 22 January
 Prime Minister – Kenneth Kaunda, Prime Minister of Northern Rhodesia (1964)
 Independence as Zambia gained on 24 October
 Federation of South Arabia 
 Governor – 
 Sir Gerald Trevaskis, High Commissioner of South Arabia (1963–1964)
 Sir Richard Gordon Turnbull, High Commissioner of South Arabia (1964–1967)
 Minister – Zayn Abdu Baharun, Chief Minister of South Arabia (1963–1965)

Colonial governors
Colonial governors
1964